Pattern for Conquest is a science fiction novel by American writer George O. Smith. It was published in 1949 by Gnome Press Reprinted circa 1952 in paper wrappers for distribution to US military personnel. Although a later printing, the first edition statement is retained on the copyright page. [Currey] isfdb Currey

Plot introduction
The novel concerns Earthmen who are overwhelmed by alien invaders, whom they then attempt to conquer from within.

Reception
P. Schuyler Miller reported that the novel showed "that he [Smith] can slip right in with "Skylark" Smith and "World Wreckers" Hamilton and slap the stars around."

References

Sources

External links 
 

1946 American novels
1949 science fiction novels
American science fiction novels
Novels first published in serial form
Works originally published in Analog Science Fiction and Fact
Alien invasions in novels
Gnome Press books